Chlorops planifrons is a species of fly in the family Chloropidae. It is found in the  Palearctic.

References

Chloropinae
Insects described in 1866
Taxa named by Hermann Loew
Muscomorph flies of Europe